Karl-Heinz Tritschler (born 16 September 1949 in Vörstetten) is a former football referee from Germany. He is known for having officiated at the 1988 Summer Olympics, and the 1989 European Cup Final between AC Milan and Steaua București.

References

External links
 Profile at worldfootball.net

1949 births
German football referees
Living people